According to Joshua 11 in the Hebrew Bible, the Battle of the Waters of Merom was a battle between the Israelites and a coalition of Canaanite city-states near the Waters of Merom. Archaeologist Nadav Na'aman has suggested that this battle may never have taken place, and that its narrative might have "preserved some remote echoes of wars conducted in these places in early Iron Age I."

In the biblical narrative, around 40 years before the battle, the Israelites escaped from slavery in Egypt, setting out for  the Exodus under the leadership of Moses. They entered Canaan near Jericho and captured several cities. An alliance of northern Canaanite city-states sent a united force to halt the Israelite invasion. The Israelites counterattacked, catching the Canaanite forces unaware and routing them with a fearsome head-on assault. The battle is described in Joshua chapter 11.

See also
Early Israelite campaigns

References

Book of Joshua
Canaan
Merom
Hula Valley